Connerton may refer to:

Connerton, Florida, a census-designated place
Connerton, Pennsylvania, an unincorporated community
a historical name for a manor in what is now Gwithian, England